Yuna may refer to:

Places
Yuna, Western Australia
Yuna River, Dominican Republic

People
Yonah Martin (born 1965), Korean-Canadian Senator
Yuna Kagesaki (born 1973), Japanese manga artist
Song Yoon-ah (born 1973), South Korean actress
Yuna Ito (born 1983), American-Japanese singer-songwriter
Yuna (singer) (born Yunalis binti Mat Zara'ai, 1986), Malaysian singer-songwriter
Maeng Yu-na (1989–2018), South Korean singer
Im Yoon-ah (born 1990), South Korean singer and actress
Yuna Kim (born 1990), South Korean figure skater
Seo Yuna (born 1992), South Korean singer and actress
Yuju (singer) (born Choi Yu-na, 1997), South Korean singer

Other uses
Yuna (album), a 2012 album by Malaysian singer Yuna
ST Yuna, an Australian tugboat
Yuna (Final Fantasy), a character from the Final Fantasy video game series

See also

Una (disambiguation)
Yuuna, a Japanese feminine given name
Yunan (disambiguation)
Yunna (disambiguation)

br:Yuna

Japanese feminine given names